This is a list of television broadcasters which provide coverage of the Belgian Pro League, the top-level competition for association football in Belgium.

2020-2025

Belgium and Luxembourg

outside Belgium and Luxembourg 
The Mediapro has been appointed to exclusively produced, distributed, and sell broadcast rights to Belgian First Division A internationally. 

Notes

References

External links
 Belgian First Division A official website

Association football on television
Belgian First Division A
Broadcast